Josef Hyrtl (7 December 1810 – 17 July 1894) was an Austrian anatomist.

Biography
Hyrtl was born at Kismarton, Hungary (now Eisenstadt, Austria). He began his medical studies in Vienna in 1831, having received his preliminary education in his native town. His parents were poor, and he had to find funds to defray the expenses of his medical education. In 1833, while he was still a student, he was named prosector in anatomy, and the preparations which this position required him to make for teaching purposes attracted the attention of professors as well as students. His graduation thesis, Antiquitates anatomicæ rariores, was a prophecy of the work to which his life was to be devoted. On graduation he became Prof. Czermak's assistant (famulus) and later became also the curator of the museum. He added valuable treasures to the museum by the preparations which he made for it. As a student he set up a little laboratory and dissecting room in his lodgings, and his injections of anatomical material were greatly admired. He took advantage of his post in the museum to give special courses in anatomy to students and in practical anatomy to physicians. These courses were numerously attended.

In 1837, when only twenty-six, Hyrtl was offered the professorship of anatomy at the University of Prague, and by his work there laid the foundation of his great reputation as a teacher of anatomy. There he completed his well-known textbook of human anatomy, which went through some twenty editions and has been translated into several languages. The chair of anatomy at Vienna fell vacant in 1845. Satisfied with the opportunities for work at Prague, he would not have applied for the post but for the insistence of his friends. He was immediately elected. Five years later he published his Handbook of Topographic Anatomy, the first textbook of applied anatomy of its kind ever issued. Before his death he was to see this department of anatomy become one of the most important portions of the teaching in the medical schools of the world. It was as a teacher that Hyrtl did his great work. Professor Karl von Bardeleben, himself one of the great teachers of the nineteenth century, did not hesitate to say that in this Hyrtl was unequalled. His fame spread throughout Europe, and he came to be looked upon as the special glory of the University of Vienna.
In 1858, he was visited by George Eliot and her partner. In her journal, she wrote: "Another great pleasure we had at Vienna—next after the sight of St. Stephen's and the pictures—was a visit to Hyrtl, the anatomist, who showed us some of his wonderful preparations, showing the vascular and nervous systems in the lungs, liver, kidneys, and intestinal canal of various animals. He told us the deeply interesting story of the loss of his fortune in the Vienna revolution of '48. He was compelled by the revolutionists to attend on the wounded for three days' running. When at last he came to his house to change his clothes he found nothing but four bare [40] walls! His fortune in Government bonds was burned along with the house, as well as all his precious collection of anatomical preparations, etc. He told us that since that great shock his nerves have been so susceptible that he sheds tears at the most trifling events, and has a depression of spirits which often keeps him silent for days. He only received a very slight sum from Government in compensation for his loss."

In 1865, on the occasion of the celebration of the five-hundredth anniversary of the foundation of the university, he was chosen rector in order that, as the most distinguished member of the university, he should represent her on that day. His inaugural address as rector had for its subject The Materialistic Conception of The Universe of Our Time. In this he argued that there was clear lack of logic in the materialistic view of the world and concluded: "When I bring all this together it is impossible for me to understand on what scientific grounds is founded this resurrection of the old materialistic view of the world that had its first great expression from Epicurus and Lucretius. Nothing that I can see justifies it, and there is no reason to think that it will continue to hold domination over men's minds."

His brother Jakob Hyrtl (1799-1868) was a Viennese engraver, who bequeathed to his brother Josef Hyrtl the skull attributed to Mozart. Josef Hyrtl examined the skull and bequeathed it to the city of Salzburg.

In 1880 there was a magnificent celebration of Hyrtl's seventieth birthday, when messages of congratulation were sent to him from all the universities of the world. After retiring from his professorship he continued to do good work, his last publication being on Arabic and Hebraic elements in anatomy. On the morning of 17 July 1894, he was found dead in bed at his estate near Vienna.

His monograph for the reform of anatomical terminology Onomatologia Anatomica (Vienna, 1880), attracted widespread attention.

References

Bibliography 
 Lehrbuch der Anatomie des Menschen (Prague, 1846)
 Handbuch der topographischen Anatomie, 2 vols., 8vo (Vienna, 1853)
 Handbuch der Zergliederungskunst (Vienna, 1860)

External link

 

1810 births
1894 deaths
19th-century Hungarian people
19th-century Austrian people
Hungarian anatomists
Hungarian scientists
Hungarian biologists
Austrian anatomists
Austrian biologists
Austrian people of Hungarian descent
People from Eisenstadt
Rectors of universities in Austria